The Palace of Tau  in Reims, France, was the palace of the Archbishop of Reims.  It is associated with the kings of France, whose coronation was held in the nearby cathedral of Notre-Dame de Reims and the following coronation banquet in the palace itself. Because of its historical importance for the French monarchy, the Palace of Tau was inscribed on the UNESCO World Heritage List in 1991.
Today, it serves to host cultural events for the city of Reims. In recent years it has been the setting for Sciences Po Paris's RIMUN association's annual gala.

History
A large Gallo-Roman villa still occupied the site of the palace in the 6th and 7th centuries, and later became a Carolingian palace.  The first documented use of the name dates to 1131, and derives from the plan of the building, which resembles the letter Τ (tau, in the Greek alphabet).  Most of the early building has disappeared: the oldest part remaining is the chapel, from 1207.  The building was largely rebuilt in Gothic style between 1498 and 1509, and modified to its present Baroque appearance between 1671 and 1710 by Jules Hardouin-Mansart and Robert de Cotte.  It was damaged by a fire on 19 September 1914, and not repaired until after the Second World War.

The Palace was the residence of the kings of France before their coronation in  Notre-Dame de Reims.  The king was dressed for the coronation at the palace before proceeding to the cathedral; afterwards, a banquet was held at the palace.  The first recorded coronation banquet was held at the palace in 990, and the most recent in 1825.

The palace has housed the Musée de l'Œuvre since 1972, displaying statuary and tapestries from the cathedral, together with the remains of the cathedral treasury and other objects associated with the coronation of the French kings.

The Palace of Tau, together with the Cathedral of Notre-Dame and the former Abbey of Saint-Remi, became a UNESCO World Heritage Site in 1991.  It attracts around 100,000 visitors each year.

See also
 Treasury of Saint-Denis

References

This article is based on a translation of the equivalent article of the French Wikipedia, dated 2006-06-20

External links

Palais du Tau website
UNESCO website
World Heritage website
Reims tourism

Tau, Palace of
Reims
Palace of Tau
Episcopal palaces
Buildings and structures in Reims
Historic house museums in Grand Est
Museums in Reims
Monuments of the Centre des monuments nationaux